Monopoly is a 1999 computer game based on the board game Monopoly, released for Microsoft Windows and Macintosh. Developed by Artech Studios, it was published by Hasbro Interactive, Inc. for Windows and MacSoft for the Mac. This title was one of many inspired by the property-dealing board game. It uses the same box art as a 1998 reissue of the 1995 Monopoly PC game. This game proved to be popular and was re-released as Monopoly New Edition (also known as Monopoly 3) on September 30, 2002, published by Infogrames. The only major difference between this game and its re-release was the absence of the board editor in Monopoly 3. A PlayStation Portable version of this game was released in 2008.

Gameplay 

The game contains very similar gameplay to the board game it is based on, with various physical tasks being replaced by automation and digital representations. It features a 1920s-style theme called "Monopoly Song".

Critical reception 

Bill Stiteler of AppleLinks.com praised the game's customisation options, and ability to accommodate player-player and player-NPC games, though criticised its computer-animated graphics and voiceovers. Mac Gamer reviewer Danilo Campos thought it was a solid adaption of the board game, but that it didn't make the physical version obsolete. Richard Hallas of Inside Mac Games described the game's graphics as "spectacular", though noted the AI can sometimes interrupt a human player's move by making trades and offers.

Meristation said Monopoly New Edition praised the interface and customisation while describing the artificial intelligence as "artificial obstinacy". Jeuxvideo.com thought the graphics were "simple", the gameplay "lack[ed] originality", its replayability was "limited", and the music was mostly "repetitive". Impulse Gamer said it lacked the excitement of the board game and could become quite repetitive. Computer Shopper said the title had the perfect mix of 3D graphics, animation, and sound. Dan Adams of IGN wrote that the game lacked in imagination and creativity. Game Over Online disliked the realistic looking design to the game.

Greg Miller of IGN said the PSP version was not groundbreaking, but that it was enjoyable and fun. PlayStation LifeStyle thought the game was simple yet fun.

References

External links 

 Monopoly at MobyGames
 Monopoly New Edition at MobyGames

1999 video games
Infogrames games
Classic Mac OS games
MacSoft games
Monopoly video games
PlayStation Portable games
Video games developed in Canada
Windows games
Artech Studios games